Thomas Schönberger (born October 14, 1986) is an Austrian professional association football player who currently plays for SV Allerheiligen. He plays as a defender.

External links

Worldfootball.net profile

1986 births
Living people
Austrian footballers
Association football defenders
Grazer AK players
Kapfenberger SV players
TSV Hartberg players
SV Allerheiligen players